Founder's Day, Founders Day, or Founders' Day and variations may refer to:

Founders' Day (Ghana), a public holiday in Ghana
Founder's Day (Music Festival) an annual campus festival at Vassar College
Founders' Day (Scouting), a Scouting commemoration associated with Scouts' Day
Founders Day (South Africa), an observance and former public holiday in South Africa
"Founder's Day" (The Vampire Diaries), a 2010 episode of the TV series The Vampire Diaries
Founders' Day, a former public holiday in Rhodesia
Founder's Day, a holiday of the American Revolution
Founder's Day, an annual event at many Indian private boarding schools, such as The Doon School